, is a Japanese yuri manga series by Yukiko. It began serialization in Gentosha's seinen magazine Monthly Birz in July 2014. Tokyopop licensed Futaribeya for release in North America and began releasing it in 2018.

Plot
Sakurako Kawawa is an intelligent and responsible girl about to start high school. Upon moving into a boarding house affiliated with the school, Sakurako meets her roommate Kasumi Yamabuki, an easygoing girl who prefers putting the least amount of effort into everything she does. The two of them quickly settle into their new life together and find that they are quite compatible with each other to the point of even sharing a bed and drinking from matching mugs.

Characters
 
Main character.

Sakurako's roommate.
Azusa
Classmate. Lives in the dorms.
Yukari Shinano
A girl with glasses who sits next to Kasumi in class.

19 years old. The boarding house's landlord and supervisor. Lives on the first floor.

Natsuki's brother. Can't stand teenage girls.
Kasumi's mother
In charge of a variety of courses and experiences at a culture school. Loves shopping for clothes.

Release
Futaribeya is written and illustrated by Yukiko. It originally began as a dōjinshi titled Futaribeya Yukiko distributed at the dōjinshi convention Comitia 107 on February 2, 2014, and according to Yukiko, this was the first dōjinshi she created. This dōjinshi was later included in Yukiko's short story collection  released in December 2016. The series began serialization in Gentosha's Monthly Birz magazine with the September 2014 issue sold on July 30, 2014. It concluded in that magazine with the May 2015 issue sold on March 30, 2015 and was transferred to Gentosha's website Denshi Birz on April 30, 2015. Denshi Birz was later renamed Comic Boost on January 15, 2019. The first tankōbon volume was published on March 24, 2015, and nine volumes have been released as of September 24, 2021. Tokyopop licensed Futaribeya for release in North America and began releasing it in 2018.

Reception
Comic Boost reported in November 2019 that over 210,000 physical and digital copies of the volumes have been sold in Japan.

References

External links
 Futaribeya at Comic Boost 
 Futaribeya  at Tokyopop
 

2014 manga
Gentosha manga
Seinen manga
LGBT in anime and manga
Slice of life anime and manga
Tokyopop titles
Yuri (genre) anime and manga